Alberto "Betinho" Valério (Ipatinga, 6 September 1985) is a Brazilian racing driver.

Career

Formula Three
Valerio drove in the Formula Three Sudamericana championship from 2003 to 2005, winning the title in his final year of the category. For 2006 he moved to the British championship, finishing 11th in the championship. 2007 saw him move to the Carlin Motorsport team and improve to eighth place in the standings.

Formula Renault
In 2004 and 2005, Valerio also drove at selected races in the Brazilian Formula Renault series. In 2006 and 2007, he drove in four races overall in the more prestigious Formula Renault 3.5 Series.

GP2 Series

For 2008, Valerio signed to drive for the Durango team in both the GP2 Series and the inaugural GP2 Asia Series.

He returned to the GP2 Asia Series for the second round onwards of the 2008–09 season by replacing Giacomo Ricci in the Trident Racing team. But he himself was replaced for the third round by Frankie Provenzano.

For 2009, he returned to the GP2 Series but moved to the Piquet GP squad as team-mate to Roldán Rodríguez. Valerio took his first win with the team, as he dominated the feature race at Silverstone. He finished fifteenth in the championship.

Valerio moved to Coloni for the 2010 season, but was dropped in favour of Álvaro Parente.

Racing record

Career summary

Complete Formula Renault 3.5 Series results
(key) (Races in bold indicate pole position) (Races in italics indicate fastest lap)

Complete GP2 Series results
(key) (Races in bold indicate pole position) (Races in italics indicate fastest lap)

Complete GP2 Asia Series results
(key) (Races in bold indicate pole position) (Races in italics indicate fastest lap)

References
Career statistics from driverdb.com.  Retrieved on February 17, 2008.

1985 births
Living people
Brazilian Formula Renault 2.0 drivers
British Formula Three Championship drivers
GP2 Series drivers
Brazilian GP2 Series drivers
GP2 Asia Series drivers
Brazilian people of Italian descent
World Series Formula V8 3.5 drivers
Stock Car Brasil drivers
Carlin racing drivers
Trident Racing drivers
Durango drivers
Scuderia Coloni drivers
Piquet GP drivers
EuroInternational drivers
Victory Engineering drivers
Comtec Racing drivers